Kathleen Fraser may refer to:
 Kathleen Fraser (kayaker) (born 1986), Canadian sprint kayaker
 Kathleen Fraser (poet) (1935–2019), American poet